Wilmore Williams (June 16, 1918 – June 30, 2002) was an American baseball right fielder in the Negro leagues.

A native of Williamsburg, Virginia, Williams played with the Newark Eagles in 1943. He served in the US Navy during World War II, and died in West Point, Virginia in 2002 at age 84.

References

External links
 and Seamheads

Newark Eagles players
1918 births
2002 deaths
Baseball players from Virginia
Baseball outfielders
Sportspeople from Williamsburg, Virginia